The Damascus CCC Camp, Co. No. 3781 was a Civilian Conservation Corps encampment on Camp Hill Road in Damascus, Arkansas.  Today, only three elements of the camp infrastructure survive: a large two-span stone arch that originally marked the camp entrance, a smaller arch that was used as a notice board, and a well.  All were built in 1935 or 1936.  At the center of the original camp property is a single-story brick ranch house, built in 1951 by the regionally noted stonemason Silas Owens, Sr.

The camp site was listed on the National Register of Historic Places in 2002.

See also
National Register of Historic Places listings in Van Buren County, Arkansas

References

Historic districts on the National Register of Historic Places in Arkansas
Buildings and structures completed in 1935
National Register of Historic Places in Van Buren County, Arkansas
Civilian Conservation Corps camps
Civilian Conservation Corps in Arkansas
Temporary populated places on the National Register of Historic Places